Georgi Ivanov Kyoseivanov (19 January 1884, Peshtera – 27 July 1960) was a Bulgarian politician who was Prime Minister from 1935 until 1940.

Kyoseivanov came to power on 23 November 1935 after a period in which the country had had three Prime Ministers in quick succession. He went on to become the longest-serving PM since Andrey Lyapchev and throughout the period of his administration he also held the post of Foreign Minister. The government oversaw the trials of the instigators of the 1934 military coup and also concluded pacts with Yugoslavia and Greece as Nazi Germany undertook a policy of economic isolation of the Balkans. His government also oversaw a policy of rearmament after a treaty concluded with Ioannis Metaxas overturned the military clauses of the Treaty of Neuilly-sur-Seine and the Treaty of Lausanne. Despite this Kyoseivanov's government was seen as little more than a puppet of Tsar Boris and, although it lasted until 1940, achieved little other than allowing the Tsar to effectively govern as a dictator.

In 1940 he became ambassador to Switzerland where he remained after the 1944 coup in Bulgaria.

References

External links
 

 

1884 births
1960 deaths
People from Peshtera
Bulgarian diplomats
Prime Ministers of Bulgaria
Ambassadors of Bulgaria to Greece
Ambassadors of Bulgaria to Switzerland
Bulgarian expatriates in Switzerland
Bulgarian military personnel of World War I
Recipients of the Order of Military Merit (Bulgaria)